Mes Shahr-e Babak Football Club is an Iranian football club based in Shahr-e Babak, Iran.

They competed in the 2010–11 Iran Football's 3rd Division, but could not advance to the second round. They finally got the 3rd place of Group 5.

They currently compete in the Azadegan League.

Season-by-Season

The table below shows the achievements of the club in various competitions.

References

Notes
 The club official website

See also
 Hazfi Cup
 Iran Football's 3rd Division 2011–12

Football clubs in Iran
Association football clubs established in 2008
2008 establishments in Iran